The Dunlop Srixon Fukushima Open was a professional golf tournament on the Japan Golf Tour. It had always been played at the Grandee Nasushirakawa Golf Club in Nishigō, Fukushima. The prize fund in 2021 was ¥50,000,000, with ¥10,000,000 going to the winner.

Winners

Notes

External links
Coverage on Japan Golf Tour's official site

Former Japan Golf Tour events
Golf tournaments in Japan
Sports competitions in Fukushima Prefecture
Recurring sporting events established in 2014
2014 establishments in Japan